Renuka Sinha (5 March 1949 – 17 August 2016) was an Indian politician and a member of parliament to the 16th Lok Sabha from Cooch Behar constituency, West Bengal. She won the 2014 general elections being an All India Trinamool Congress candidate.
She was a graduate of the University of Calcutta. She died on 17 August due to a heart attack.

References

1949 births
2016 deaths
India MPs 2014–2019
Trinamool Congress politicians from West Bengal
Lok Sabha members from West Bengal
People from Cooch Behar district
University of Calcutta alumni
Women in West Bengal politics
21st-century Indian women politicians
21st-century Indian politicians